Good Morning Kuya (English: Good Morning Brother) is a morning news-talk program conceptualized by Kuya Daniel Razon which airs on UNTV-37 in the Philippines every weekday morning. The show also provides various public services by means of a free clinic, a free orphanage, free education, free transient home, free legal services  and free rides during weekday mornings. Look-a-likes of Manny Pacquiao (a.k.a. Manny Pangyaw) and Mr. Bean (a.k.a. Mr. Bin) gives an added twist in the show. Good Morning Kuya or GMK can be viewed from 5:00 am to 7:30 am. In 2015, it extended again back to 3 hours from 5:00 am to 8:00 am. on June 15, 2020, the program is back to 2 hours and 30 minutes from 6:00 am to 8:30 am PST.

Hosts

Current hosts
 Daniel Razon
 Rheena Villamor-Camara
 Ayra Mariano
 Joshua Dionisio
 Ian Miranda
 Tini Balanon
 Celine Ang

Segment hosts
 Dr. Janis Ann Espino-De Vera
 Dr. Joseph Lee
 Dr. Bong Santiago
 Dr. Sarah Barba-Cabodil

Former hosts
 Monica Verallo
 Atty. Regie Tongol
 Allan Encarnacion
 Eloisa "Lola Selah" Cruz Canlas
 Ka Tony Arevalo
 Robbie Packing
 Bryan "Wonder Boy" Evangelista
 Carls Teng
 Lyn Perez
 Sahlee "Datgirl" Piamonte
 Dave Tirao
 Krist Melecio
 Wanlu
 Ryan Ramos
 Rodel Flordeliz
 Lea Ylagan
 Nina Taduran
 Jun Soriao
 Nick the Barber
 Ponce dela Paz
 Lorenzo "Erin" Tañada III
 Rey Pelayo
 Ninang Riza Muyot
 Ka Rene Jose
 Chris "Porky" dela Cruz
 Minyong
 Manny Pangyaw
 Diego Castro III (moved to One PH)
 Angela Lagunzad (moved to One PH)
 Erica "Kikay" Honrado (moved to IBC 13)
 Beth Santiago

Segments
  Rise and Shine - every Mondays
 Biblically Speaking – Bible-related Topics with Bro. Eli Soriano
 Connecting Pinoys Around the World – UNTV correspondents shows how citizens on other countries spend their daily lives
 Cook Eat Right Pamana – demonstration of cooking special recipes inherited from previous generations
 Eatymology – etymology of traditional Filipino foods with Ms. Krizia Erika Paylago
 Fitness 101 – Fitness exercises and tips with Rheena Villamor-Camara
 Ikonsulta Finance – Financial advices with Ninang Riza Muyot
 Ikonsulta Legal – Legal Issues with Cong. Erin Tañada
 Live Feature – features introducing indoor and outdoor activities
 Philhealth – PhilHealth representatives Raymond Acoba and Delio Aseron discusses different topics regarding the organization's processes
 Something Good – viral Social Media posts spreading positive vibes
 Techy Muna – Technology updates narrated by Leslie Longboen
 Today in History
 Usapang Pangkalusugan – Health Info with Dr. Janis De Vera, Dr. Joseph Lee, Dr. Bong Santiago, Dr. Sarah Barba-Cabodil, and guest doctors
 What's For Breakfast? – Recipe of the Day with guest cooks
 Wishful Journey – weekly performance of the Wishful 5 every Friday
 Word for the day – word for the day narrated by Leslie Longboen

Awards
In 2009, the show was awarded as one of the Best Philippine Morning Shows in the 23rd Star Awards for Television (Philippines). Its hosts were also nominated in the Star awards as Best Morning Show Hosts for Philippine Television.

In 2018, Good Morning Kuya was awarded an Anak TV Seal for being a family-friendly program, alongside other UNTV shows.

References

Members Church of God International
UNTV (Philippines) original programming
Philippine television news shows
2007 Philippine television series debuts
Breakfast television in the Philippines
Filipino-language television shows